The 2015 NCAA Division III men's basketball tournament was a single-elimination tournament involving 62 teams to determine the men's collegiate basketball national champion of National Collegiate Athletic Association (NCAA) Division III.  The tournament took place during March 2015, with the national semifinal and championship rounds taking place at the Salem Civic Center in Salem, Virginia.

Wisconsin–Stevens Point defeated Augustana (IL), 70–54, to win their fourth Division III national championship.

Regional Rounds

Regional 1 – Rock Island, Illinois

Regional 2 – Babson Park, Massachusetts

Regional 3 – Ashland, Virginia

Regional 4 – Stevens Point, Wisconsin

National Finals – Salem, Virginia

See also
2015 NCAA Division I men's basketball tournament
2015 NCAA Division II men's basketball tournament

References

NCAA Division III men's basketball tournament
Ncaa Tournament
NCAA Division III Men's Basketball